Glomeremus orchidophilus is a recently (2010) discovered species of raspy cricket found in the island of Réunion in the Mascarene Islands. It is the only known pollinator of the  orchid Angraecum cadetii. It is also the only cricket known to pollinate a flower.

References

External links 
Video of Glomeremus orchidophilus hosted by BBC News

Insects described in 2010
Insects of Réunion
Orchid pollinators
Gryllacrididae